Mosiah Rodrigues (born 31 August 1981) is a Brazilian male artistic gymnast, representing his nation at international competitions.  He participated at the 2004 Summer Olympics. He also competed at world championships, including the 2005 World Artistic Gymnastics Championships in Melbourne, Australia,  and at the Pan-American Games.

Rodrigues won two bronze medals at the 2003 Games, in Santo Domingo for the high bar and pommel horse and a silver medal for  the team competition.

Rodrigues is a practicing member of the Church of Jesus Christ of Latter-day Saints, his parents being converts to that faith.

References

1981 births
Living people
Brazilian male artistic gymnasts
Sportspeople from Porto Alegre
Brazilian Latter Day Saints
Gymnasts at the 2004 Summer Olympics
Olympic gymnasts of Brazil
Gymnasts at the 2007 Pan American Games
Pan American Games silver medalists for Brazil
Pan American Games gold medalists for Brazil
Pan American Games bronze medalists for Brazil
Pan American Games medalists in gymnastics
Universiade medalists in gymnastics
South American Games gold medalists for Brazil
South American Games silver medalists for Brazil
South American Games bronze medalists for Brazil
South American Games medalists in gymnastics
Competitors at the 1998 South American Games
Competitors at the 2002 South American Games
Competitors at the 2006 South American Games
Competitors at the 2010 South American Games
Universiade silver medalists for Brazil
Medalists at the 2005 Summer Universiade
Medalists at the 2007 Pan American Games
Medalists at the 2003 Pan American Games
20th-century Brazilian people
21st-century Brazilian people